Sinoe is a genus of moth in the family Gelechiidae.

Species
Sinoe capsana Lee & Brambila, 2012
Sinoe chambersi Lee & Brambila, 2012
Sinoe kwakae Lee & Brambila, 2012
Sinoe robiniella (Fitch, 1859)

References

Litini
Moth genera